Yuri Viktorovich Trubachev (born March 9, 1983) is a Russian former professional ice hockey winger who most notably played for Severstal Cherepovets of the Kontinental Hockey League (KHL). He was selected by the Calgary Flames in the 5th round (164th overall) of the 2001 NHL Entry Draft. He currently serves as an assistant coach with former club, Severstal Cherepovets.

Career statistics

Regular season and playoffs

International

References

External links 

1983 births
Living people
Atlant Moscow Oblast players
Calgary Flames draft picks
Salavat Yulaev Ufa players
Severstal Cherepovets players
SKA Saint Petersburg players
Russian ice hockey right wingers